Pitobash Tripathy (born 1984), also known simply as Pitobash, is an Indian actor who works in Bollywood films. He is known for his role in the movies I Am Kalam, Begum Jaan, Shor in the City, Mom, the Hollywood film Million Dollar Arm and the National Award-winning Odia film Kalira Atita.

Early life and education 
Tripathy was born in 1984 in Nayagarh, Odisha.
He was brought up in Bhubaneswar where he completed his schooling from the Government High School, Unit 1, Bhubaneswar. Then, he joined Buxi Jagabandhu Bidyadhar College, Bhubaneswar for his higher secondary education. He completed a Bachelor of Technology degree in 2005 from the Government College of Engineering and Leather Technology from Kolkata, and he also holds a diploma in acting from the Film and Television Institute of India.

Tripathy was awarded with the National Bal Shree Honour from the President of India in the field of creative performance at the age of 12. He was also involved in theater in Kolkata. in 2007. Later on, he joined the Bollywood industry as an actor.

Career 
Tripathy started acting with the movie 99. He then appeared in a supporting role in 3 Idiots. Later, he acted in I Am Kalam, directed by Nila Madhab Panda, and Shor in the City. He also acted in the movie Mirch in five different roles. Additional appearances include the films Joker, Aalaap, Shanghai and Once Upon a Time in Mumbai Dobaara!.

Filmography

Web series 

2022- Dr.Arora

Awards and honors

Odisha Youth Inspiration Award – 2012 

 2012  Odisha Youth Inspiration Award

Screen Awards 
Winner:
 2012 – Screen Best Actor in a Comic Role Award for Shor in the City

Nominated:
 2012 – Screen Promising Newcomer Of The Year for Shor in the City

Filmfare Awards 
Nominated:
 2012 – Filmfare Best Supporting Actor Award for Shor in the City

Stardust Awards 
Nominated:
 2012 – Stardust Best Actor (Search lights)Award for Shor in the City

Global Indian Film and Television Honours 
Nominated:
 2012 – GIFTH Best Actor In A Supporting Role Award for Shor in the City

Other awards 
 1996: National Bal Shree Honour – from President of India, Dr. Shankar Dayal Sharma in Creative Performance

References

External links 

Male actors from Odisha
Male actors in Hindi cinema
21st-century Indian male actors
Living people
1984 births
People from Nayagarh district
Screen Awards winners